The Dushkin S-155 was a liquid-fueled rocket motor designed by Leonid Dushkin specifically for use in the Mikoyan-Gurevich Ye-50 and Ye-50A (aka MiG-23U) experimental-developmental aircraft in the 1950s. It delivered 37.3 kN (8380 lbf) and ran on a mix of TG-02 hypergolic kerosene and AK-20 oxidizer (nitric acid). The fuel pumps were powered with grade T hydrogen peroxide.

References

Aircraft rocket engines
Rocket engines using kerosene propellant
Rocket engines using hypergolic propellant